The Samsung Galaxy C9 Pro is an Android smartphone produced by Samsung Electronics. It was unveiled and released in November 2016. It is the first Galaxy smartphone to be backed by 6 GB of RAM.

References 

Android (operating system) devices
Samsung smartphones
Mobile phones introduced in 2016
Samsung Galaxy
Discontinued smartphones